Rinorea bengalensis  is a species of plant in the family Violaceae.

References

bengalensis